Chris Lang (born 1961) is a British screenwriter, producer and actor. Lang has written for many British television series but is best known as the writer, creator and executive producer of Unforgotten.

Career

Actor 
He trained at RADA, graduating in 1983, after winning the Royal Academy award for 'A Series of Outstanding Performances in the Vanbrugh Theatre'. As an actor he worked on such British television series as Shadow of the Noose, Drop the Dead Donkey, Outside Edge, A Dance to the Music of Time and All Along the Watchtower. In his youth, he formed a comedy revue called The Jockeys of Norfolk with Andy Taylor and Hugh Grant, but stopped acting in the mid nineties in order to fully concentrate on his writing career.

Screenwriter 
Lang began his screenwriting career on The Bill, for which he wrote many episodes, and for which he won a Writer's Guild award. He went on to write episodes for shows including Casualty, Soldier Soldier, The Knock, POW, Primeval, Hustle and The Tunnel for Sky Atlantic. In 2001, he wrote and created his first original drama series 'The Glass', which starred John Thaw and Sarah Lancashire. Since then some of his other original work has included Sirens, Unconditional Love, Amnesia (which was nominated for an Edgar Award), Lawless, and The Reckoning.

The first series of Unforgotten starred Nicola Walker, Trevor Eve, Sir Tom Courtenay, Cherie Lunghi, Sanjeev Bhaskar, Gemma Jones, Hannah Gordon, Ruth Sheen and Bernard Hill.[8] was broadcast in Autumn 2015. Sir Tom Courtenay later won the 2016 BAFTA for Best Supporting Actor for his role, and was nominated for a RTS award for his performance, while Nicola Walker was nominated at the Broadcasting Press Guild Awards for best actress. 

In November 2015, ITV announced it would be returning for a second series  which aired in January 2017 to an audience of 7.29 million, with the Daily Telegraph describing the series as 'The detective drama of the decade'. In November 2017 Mark Bonnar won the 2017 Best Actor BAFTA Scotland for his portrayal of Colin Osborne in the series. Bonnar also won best actor in the Broadcasting Press Guild Awards 2018.

In March 2017, ITV announced Unforgotten would return for a third series  which aired in July 2018 and received universal critical acclaim, with The Observer asking 'How good is Unforgotten...one of our most human and humane cop shows', and The Guardian remarking that 'Unforgotten is once again superb....it's beautifully crafted and performed, tight, gripping, but also moving and so very human...there is no better drama on television.' The last episode was watched by over 7.5 million viewers, making it the most watched episode of all three series. Alex Jennings was later nominated by BAFTA for Best Supporting Actor for his role as Tim Finch in the series.

In December 2018 The Hook Up Plan, an eight-part romantic comedy that Lang created and co-wrote, and which shot in Paris, aired on Netflix. It starred Zita Hanrot, Sabrina Ouazani, Joséphine Draï and Marc Ruchmann. In February 2019 Netflix announced it would return for a second series which broadcast in 2020. 

In October 2018, a new six-part drama called Dark Heart, which Lang wrote and executive produced, and which starred Tom Riley, Charlotte Riley, Anjili Mohindra and Miranda Raison broadcast in the UK with the 1st episode attracting an audience of 6.3 million.

In February 2021 'Unforgotten returned for a fourth series, to universal critical acclaim and an average rating across the series of 9.5 million, up on series 3 by an average of 2.5 million per episode. It was nominated as best drama by both BAFTA and Royal Television Society. A few months later series 4 was broadcast in the states on PBS. Series 1-3 are currently playing around the world on Netflix, Amazon and Sky. It will return for a fifth series in early 2023 with Sinead Keenan now starring alongside Sanjeev Bhaskar.

In the late noughties, he co-formed TXTV, through which he made much of his work, including Innocent, a four-part thriller starring Lee Ingleby, Hermione Norris, Nigel Lindsay and Angel Coulby. which broadcast on 14–17 May 2018 to a consolidated first night audience of 8.05 million, making it the most watched new ITV drama of the year, with The Daily Express calling it - 'Spellbinding...the TV drama that has got the whole nation watching". Innocent returned for a second series which broadcast on Monday 17 May 2021 to an average audience across the four episodes of 7.4 million.

Other TXTV shows include ; Undeniable starring Peter Firth and Claire Goose, (April 2014); which was remade in France in February 2017, entitled 'Quand Je Serai Grande Je Te Tuerai' starring Laetitia Milot. Filmed on the Île de Ré it broadcast in France in late 2017 to an audience of seven million. ; A Mother's Son starring Hermione Norris, Paul McGann and Martin Clunes (September 2012) which was nominated for a Broadcast Award, and adapted as a single film for TF1 in France called 'Tu Es Mon Fils' (April 2015) and starring Anne Marivin; 'Tu Es Mon Fils' later won best single film at the Polar de Cognac Film Festival.; Lang's series Torn, starring Holly Aird and Nicola Walker, was nominated for an RTS award. and was also remade for French TV as 'Entre Deux Mères' It was shown at the Luchon Film and TV festival and broadcast on TF1 on 27 March 2017. The French remake of his 2010 UK TXTV drama The Reckoning starred Odille Vuillemin and Thiery Neuvic and aired in September 2018.

In January 2021 it was announced that Viaplay/Elisa were remaking A Mother's Son in Finland. Retitled 'Polanski Joel', it broadcast in mid 2022.

April 2022 saw the broadcast of The Thief, His Wife and the Canoe starring Monica Dolan and Eddie Marsan, the true story of John and Anne Darwin, which Lang wrote and for which he was the executive producer. It aired to a first episode audience of 10.01 million, making it the third most watched UK drama of the year. The series was selected for competition at the Geneva International Film Festival in November 2022 with Lang as a guest speaker and was nominated for 'Best serial' at the 'Broadcast Awards' 2022

 Selected work 
 Unforgotten (Mainstreet Pictures, 2015–present)
 Innocent (TXTV, 2018-2021)
 The Thief, His Wife and the Canoe (Story Films 2022)
 Dark Heart  (Silverprint,2018)
 Undeniable (TXTV, 2014)
 A Mother's Son (ITV Studios 2012)
 Torn (TXTV, 2007)
 Lawless (Company Pictures, 2004)
 Amnesia (Ecosse Films, 2004)

 Awards and nominations The Thief, His Wife and the Canoe Monica Dolan nominated best actor Royal Television Society 2023The Thief, His Wife and the Canoe. Nominated Best series BPG 2022The Thief, His Wife and the Canoe. Nominated Best serial 'Broadcast Awards' 2022Unforgotten. Nominated Best drama BAFTA 2021
 Unforgotten Nominated best drama Royal Television Society 2021
 Unforgotten Chris Lang nominated for BPG best writer 2021
 Unforgotten Nominated Best Returning Drama 2021 National Television AwardsUnforgotten. Alex Jennings nominated Best Supporting Actor BAFTA 2019
 Unforgotten. Chris Lang Nominated Best Crime Drama Writer 2017 London Screenwriters' Festival
 Unforgotten Mark Bonnar Winner of 2017 Best Actor BAFTA Scotland
 Unforgotten Mark Bonnar Winner of BPG award best actor. 2017
 Unforgotten: Tom Courtenay, winner of 2016 BAFTA for best supporting actor 
 Unforgotten: Tom Courtenay, nominated for 2016 Royal Television Society award for Best Actor; 
 Unforgotten:Nicola Walker nominated for BPG award Best Actress 2016
 Unforgotten. Nominated Best English Speaking Drama Series. C21 Awards 2016
 Unforgotten. Nominated Best Casting. C21 Awards 2016
 The Tunnel Winner Best Multi Channel Programme BPG 2014
 The Tunnel Nominated Best Drama Series International Emmy Award2014
 A Mother's Son: nominated Best Single Drama 'Broadcast Awards' 2013
 Torn nominated Best Serial, Royal Television Society 2008
 Amnesia: nominated Best Mini Series at the Edgars 2005
 Wing and a Prayer: Winner of best drama series BAFTA Award 1998
 The Bill''. Winner 'Best Original Drama Series' 1995 Writer's Guild of Great Britain.

Notes

External links
Official Website 

Chris Lang  in the BBC Guide to Comedy

Living people
1961 births
British male television actors
British male voice actors
British television producers
British television writers
British writers
English male screenwriters
English television writers
British male television writers